The 1989 Jade Solid Gold Best Ten Music Awards Presentation was held in January 1990 at The Hong Kong Academy for Performing Arts. It is part of the Jade Solid Gold Best Ten Music Awards Presentation series held in Hong Kong.

Top 10 song awards
The top 10 songs (十大勁歌金曲) of 1989 are as follows.

Additional awards

References
 Top ten songs award 1989, Tvcity.tvb.com
 Additional awards 1989, Tvcity.tvb.com

Jade Solid Gold Best Ten Music Awards Presentation, 1989
Jade Solid Gold Best Ten Music Awards